This is the list of cinemas located in Estonia. The list is incomplete.

References 

 
Estonia
Cinemas